Máel Dúin may refer to:
 the protagonist of The Voyage of Máel Dúin (Old Irish: Immram Maele Dúin).
 Máel Dúin mac Áedo Bennán (died c.661), king of Iarmuman (West Munster)
 Máel Dúin mac Conaill (died c.668), king in Dál Riata
 Máel Dúin mac Máele Fithrich (died 681), king of Ailech
 Máel Dúin mac Fergusa (died 785), king of Lagore
 Máel Dúin mac Áedo Alláin (died 788), king of Ailech
 Máel Dúin mac Áedo (died 796), perhaps king of Munster
 Máel Dúin (bishop of the Scots) (died 1055), bishop of Cennrígmonaid, modern St Andrews, Scotland